Paul Browning may refer to:

 Doctor Browning, a fictional character from the British soap opera Hollyoaks
 Paul Browning (American football) (born 1992), American football wide receiver